Brefeldin A-inhibited guanine nucleotide-exchange protein 2 is a protein that in humans is encoded by the ARFGEF2 gene.

Function 

ADP-ribosylation factors (ARFs) play an important role in intracellular vesicular trafficking. The protein encoded by this gene is involved in the activation of ARFs by accelerating replacement of bound GDP with GTP and is involved in Golgi transport. It contains a Sec7 domain, which may be responsible for its guanine-nucleotide exchange activity and also brefeldin A inhibition.

Interactions 

ARFGEF2 has been shown to interact with ARFGEF1, PRKAR1A and PRKAR2A.

References

External links

Further reading